Michael Steven Hessman (born March 5, 1978) is an American former professional baseball first baseman and third baseman. He is currently a hitting coach for the Toledo Mud Hens. He played in the MLB for the Atlanta Braves, Detroit Tigers, and New York Mets, and in Nippon Professional Baseball (NPB) for the Orix Buffaloes. 

Hessman holds the all-time record for International League home runs, when he hit his 259th on June 30, 2014, breaking Ollie Carnegie's record set in 1945. In 2015, he broke Buzz Arlett's record for the most career minor league home runs, hitting his 433rd on August 3, 2015.

Professional career
Hessman was originally drafted out of Mater Dei High School in the 15th round (452nd overall) by the Atlanta Braves in the 1996 MLB draft. He spent eight years in the Braves organization before making his Major League debut on August 22, 2003. His first major league hit was a pinch-hit home run on August 26, 2003, off New York Mets pitcher Mike Stanton.

Hessman signed a minor league contract with the Detroit Tigers on January 7, 2005. He played for the Tigers' Triple-A affiliate, the Toledo Mud Hens, for the whole season, and helped them win the International League championship for the first time in 38 years. Hessman batted .214 with 28 home runs and 74 RBI. He spent the entire 2006 season with the Mud Hens, contributing to the Mud Hens' second consecutive Governors' Cup. Though he hit 24 home runs that season, he hit just .165.

Hessman played 117 games for the Mud Hens in 2007, and hit .254 with 31 home runs and 101 RBI. On June 1, he hit his 68th career home run with the Mud Hens, breaking Erve Beck's 107-year old franchise record. Hessman also appeared in 17 games with the Tigers in 2007, hitting .235 with 4 home runs and 12 RBI. On August 28, 2007, Hessman was named the  International League Most Valuable Player, and joined Phil Hiatt (1996), Tim Teufel (1983), and Joe Lis (1976) as the only Mud Hens to win the award.

Hessman began the 2008 season with Toledo. On July 16, 2008, he was named to the United States national baseball team for the 2008 Summer Olympics. Despite missing an entire month of the minor league season, Hessman hit 34 home runs for the Mud Hens in 2008. He also appeared in 12 games for the Tigers, and hit .296 with five home runs and seven RBI.

On September 4, 2009, Hessman played all nine positions while with the Mud Hens. He started at catcher and ended as the pitcher, blowing the save and taking the loss. In total, he hit .217 with 23 home runs and 77 RBI in 2009, and became a free agent at the end of the season.

On December 8, 2009, Hessman signed a minor league deal with the New York Mets. The Mets assigned Hessman to the Triple-A Buffalo Bisons, where he hit .274 with 18 home runs and 58 RBI in 64 games. He also appeared in 32 games for the Mets in 2010, mostly as a pinch-hitter, and batted .127 with one home run and six RBI.

On November 10, 2010, Hessman was outrighted by the Mets, but refused the assignment and became a free agent. Hessman signed with the Orix Buffaloes of Nippon Professional Baseball for the 2011 season. He appeared in 48 games for Orix, batting .192 with 6 home runs and 14 RBI. In 2012, Hessman played with the Oklahoma City RedHawks, Triple-A affiliate of the Houston Astros, and hit .231 with 35 home runs and 78 RBI in 123 games.

In late November 2012, the Cincinnati Reds signed Hessman to a minor league deal. He was assigned to the Triple-A Louisville Bats, and played the entire 2013 season with the team, batting .240 with 25 home runs and 56 RBI. Hessman rejoined the Tigers organization in late 2013, and on June 30, 2014, while playing with Toledo, hit his 259th International League home run, setting the career record for that league. Hessman hit .248 in 116 games with Toledo that season, along with 28 home runs and 64 RBI. In the offseason, he played in 14 games for the Tigres de Aragua of the Venezuelan Winter League, as well as 6 games for the Tomateros de Culiacán of the Mexican Pacific Winter League.

On August 3, 2015, while playing for the Mud Hens, Hessman hit his 433rd career home run – a grand slam – off Dustin McGowan of the Lehigh Valley IronPigs, setting a new minor league baseball record for the most home runs in a career, surpassing the 78-year-old record set by Buzz Arlett of the Oakland Oaks in 1937. Hessman is one of only six players in history to hit over 400 home runs in the minor leagues.

On November 28, 2015, Hessman announced his retirement.

Post-playing career
On December 3, 2015, Hessman was named the hitting coach for the Short-Season A Connecticut Tigers for the 2016 season. He was named the hitting coach for the Class A West Michigan Whitecaps for the 2017 season, and coached the Mesa Solar Sox of the Arizona Fall League after the regular season. In 2018, Hessman was the hitting coach for the Erie SeaWolves. Hessman served as a hitting coach for the Toledo Mud Hens beginning with the 2019 season. On June 12, 2021, Hessman was promoted to assistant hitting coach for the Detroit Tigers.

References

External links

Mud Hens page
Minor league baseball page

1978 births
Living people
American expatriate baseball players in Japan
Atlanta Braves players
Baseball coaches from California
Baseball players at the 2008 Summer Olympics
Baseball players from California
Buffalo Bisons (minor league) players
Danville 97s players
Danville Braves players
Detroit Tigers coaches
Detroit Tigers players
Greenville Braves players
Gulf Coast Braves players
Gulf Coast Mets players
Louisville Bats players
Macon Braves players
Major League Baseball first basemen
Major League Baseball third basemen
Medalists at the 2008 Summer Olympics
Minor league baseball coaches
Myrtle Beach Pelicans players
New York Mets players
Oklahoma City RedHawks players
Olympic bronze medalists for the United States in baseball
Orix Buffaloes players
Richmond Braves players
Toledo Mud Hens players
International League MVP award winners
American expatriate baseball players in Australia